Vangen may refer to:

Places
Vangen, Akershus, a village in Fet municipality, Akershus county, Norway
Vangen, Enebakk, a tourist retreat in Enebakk municipality, Akershus county, Norway
Vossevangen or simply Vangen, a village in Voss municipality, Hordaland county, Norway
Vangen Church (Aurland), a church in Aurland municipality, Sogn og Fjordane county, Norway
Vangen Church (South Dakota), a church in Mission Hill, South Dakota, USA
Vangen power station, one of the five facilities that are part of the Aurland Hydroelectric Power Station

People
Thorleif Vangen, a Norwegian skier from Kongsvinger